Robert H. "Bob" Young (November 7, 1923 – January 19, 2011) was a television news journalist for ABC News.  He served as the anchor of The ABC Evening News (now known as World News Tonight) from October 1967 to May 1968. Young's most noteworthy broadcast took place on April 4, 1968, when he anchored ABC's coverage of the assassination of Martin Luther King Jr.

After leaving ABC, Young went to WCBS-TV in New York City where he anchored the 11:00 p.m. newscast until 1971. He later returned to radio news anchoring at New York's all-news WINS (AM), NBC Radio News and UPI Audio. He then turned to public relations work.

Young died on January 19, 2011, in Ridgewood, New Jersey, at the age of 87.

References

External links
 Bob Young reports Dr. Martin Luther King, Jr.'s assassination

1923 births
2011 deaths
20th-century American journalists
ABC News personalities
American male journalists
American radio news anchors
American television journalists
People from Covington, Kentucky